Oğuz Tezmen (born 1948 in Istanbul) is a Turkish politician. He was Minister of Transport and Communication in the 52nd government of Turkey and member of the 21st Parliament of Turkey.

References

1948 births
Ministers of Transport and Communications of Turkey
Members of the 21st Parliament of Turkey
Living people